The 1972 Connecticut Huskies baseball team represented the University of Connecticut in the 1972 NCAA University Division baseball season. The Huskies were led by Larry Panciera in his 11th year as head coach, and played as part of the Yankee Conference. Connecticut posted a 20–7 record, won the Yankee Conference with an undefeated regular season, swept the NCAA District 1 Playoff and reached the 1972 College World Series, their fourth appearance in the penultimate college baseball event. The Huskies won their first game against Texas before falling to eventual champion Southern California in extra innings and being eliminated by  the next day.

Roster

Schedule

References 

Connecticut
UConn Huskies baseball seasons
College World Series seasons
Yankee Conference baseball champion seasons
Connecticut baseball